Chain Tan Pyi, is a 1948 Burmese black-and-white drama film, directed by Tin Maung starring Tin Maung, May Shin and May Thit.

Cast
Tin Maung as Thar Khin
May Shin as May Shin
May Thit as Hnin Thit
Thar Gaung as Thar Gaung

References

1948 films
Burmese-language films
Films shot in Myanmar
Burmese black-and-white films